Lakeboat is a 2000 American drama film, adapted by David Mamet from his 1970 play of the same name, directed by Joe Mantegna and starring Charles Durning, Peter Falk, Denis Leary and Andy García.

Plot
A young man, Dale Katzman, a college student from an Ivy League school "near Boston" takes a summer job as the night cook in the galley of the Seaway Queen, a lake boat bulk carrier on the Great Lakes for a Chicago-based steel concern. Dale's predecessor, Guigliani, endured a particularly violent end while on terra firma, the cause and nature of which is speculated by the other crew members. Dale, and the audience, gets to know each of them, including: Fireman, who reads voraciously when not "watching the gauges"; Fred, who imparts his unique, politically incorrect philosophy regarding women on the young man; and, especially, Joe Litko, a 23-year veteran of the seas, who sees much of himself in Dale. The dialogue is Mametspeak at its most raw, as secrets are shared, picayune matters are debated, and fantasies are laid out, vividly.

Cast
Charles Durning as Skippy
Peter Falk as The Pierman
Denis Leary as The Fireman
Robert Forster as Joe Litko
J. J. Johnston as Stan
Tony Mamet as Dale Katzman
Jack Wallace as Fred
George Wendt as First Mate Collins
Andy Garcia as Guigliani
Saul Rubinek as Cuthman
Joe Mantegna as Guy at Gate (uncredited)

Reception
The film has an 83% rating on Rotten Tomatoes.  Roger Ebert awarded the film three stars.

Box office
The film earned $5,159 on a limited release in the United States.

References

External links

2000 drama films
2000 films
2000s English-language films
American drama films
Shoreline Entertainment films
2000s American films